I Love You. It's a Fever Dream. is the fifth LP by The Tallest Man on Earth. It was released digitally on 19 April 2019, and was released on CD and vinyl in June 2019, through the label Dead Oceans.

Track listing

Personnel
 Kristian Matsson – instruments and vocals

Charts

References

External links
  The Tallest Man on Earth's page on Dead Ocean Records  
 

2019 albums
The Tallest Man on Earth albums
Dead Oceans albums